August Theodor Låstbom (1815–1845) was a Swedish historian.

Biography
He was born in 1815 in Västerås, Sweden. In 1842 he wrote Swea och Götha höfdinga-minne sedan. In 1843 he wrote Konungariket Norges Ståthållare, Stifts-Amtmän, Amtmän och Commendanter sedan år 1814. He died in 1845 in Uppsala.

Works
Matrikel öfver ordinarie tjenstemän vid församlingarna och läroverken i Sverige
Swea och Götha höfdinga-minne sedan 1720, 2 vols. Upsala, 1842–43
Konungariket Norges Ståthållare, Stifts-Amtmän, Amtmän och Commendanter sedan år 1814, eller detta Rikes förening med Swerige, Upsala, 1843

References

1815 births
1845 deaths
19th-century Swedish historians
Swedish antiquarians